The robust striped gecko (Strophurus michaelseni), also known commonly as Michaelsen's spiny-tailed gecko, is a species of lizard in the family Diplodactylidae. The species is endemic to Australia.

Etymology
The specific name, michaelseni, is in honour of German zoologist Wilhelm Michaelsen.

Geographic range
S. michaelseni is found on the central coast and in the adjacent interior of Western Australia, Australia.

Habitat
The natural habitats of S. michaelseni are forest, shrubland, and grassland.

Reproduction
S. michaelseni is oviparous.

References

Further reading
Cogger HG (2014). Reptiles and Amphibians of Australia, Seventh Edition. Clayton, Victoria, Australia: CSIRO Publishing. xxx + 1,033 pp. .
Rösler H (2000). "Kommentierte Liste der rezent, subrezent und fossil bekannten Geckotaxa (Reptilia: Gekkonomorpha)". Gekkota 2: 28–153. (Strophurus michaelseni, p. 115). (in German).
Werner F (1910). "Reptilia (Geckonidae und Scincidae) ". pp. 451–493. In: Michaelsen W, Hartmeyer R (1910). Die Fauna Südwest-Australiens. Ergebnisse der Hamburger südwest-australischen Forschungsreise 1905. Band II [Volume 2]. Jena: Gustav Fischer. 493 pp. (Diplodactylus michaelseni, new species, pp. 460-461, Figure 3). (in German).
Wilson, Steve; Swan, Gerry (2013). A Complete Guide to Reptiles of Australia, Fourth Edition. Sydney: New Holland Publishers. 522 pp. .

Strophurus
Reptiles described in 1910
Taxa named by Franz Werner
Geckos of Australia